Wayne Robert LaPierre Jr. (born November 8, 1949) is an American gun rights lobbyist who is CEO and executive vice president of the National Rifle Association (NRA), a position he has held since 1991.

Personal background
Wayne Robert LaPierre, Jr. was born on November 8, 1949, in Schenectady, New York, the eldest child of Hazel (Gordon) and Wayne Robert LaPierre, Sr. His father was an accountant for the local General Electric plant. The LaPierre family trace their patrilineal heritage to a 17th century French ancestor who emigrated from the Brittany region of France to New France (now Quebec, Canada). His family moved to Roanoke, Virginia, when LaPierre, Jr. was five years old, and he was raised in the Roman Catholic church.  LaPierre first received a student deferment, then a medical deferment (the cause of which is still publicly unknown) and therefore was not drafted into military service during the Vietnam War.

After divorcing his first wife, LaPierre married Susan Znidorka in 1998.

Career
Wayne LaPierre has been a government activist and lobbyist since receiving his master's degree in government and politics, including positions on the board of directors of the American Association of Political Consultants, the American Conservative Union, and the National Fish and Wildlife Foundation.

National Rifle Association activity
Since 1991, he has served as EVP and chief executive of the NRA, the largest gun rights advocacy and firearms safety training/marksmanship organization in the United States. LaPierre joined the NRA in 1977 after working as a legislative aide to Democratic Virginia delegate and gun rights advocate Vic Thomas.

In 2014, NRA contributions totaled $103 million and LaPierre's compensation was $985,885. In 2015, NRA contributions totaled $95 million. In that year, LaPierre received a $3.7 million deferred compensation distribution from his "employee funded deferred compensation plan", which was required by federal law, and according to the NRA raised his total annual compensation to $5,110,985.

On August 6, 2020, following 18 months of investigation, New York Attorney General Letitia James filed a civil lawsuit against the NRA and LaPierre, as well as treasurer Wilson Phillips, former chief of staff and current executive director of general operations Joshua Powell and general counsel and secretary John Frazer, alleging fraud, financial misconduct, and misuse of charitable funds, and calling for the dissolution of the association due to chronic fraudulent management. The NRA attempted to have the case moved to Texas and the dissolution lawsuit dismissed, but federal Judge Harlin Hale of the Northern District of Texas ruled that the effort was made in bad faith. LaPierre's compensation and exorbitant corporate spending on personal items such as expensive suits, chartered jet flights, and a traveling "glam squad" for his wife, drew attention in the eleven-day hearing. In March, 2022, New York Supreme Court Justice Joel Cohen denied the claim to dissolve the NRA, while allowing the lawsuit against Pierre and the organization to move forward.

Views on gun rights

LaPierre has called for the presence of "armed, trained, qualified school security personnel" at schools. At a press conference in the wake of the December 14, 2012 Sandy Hook Elementary School shooting, LaPierre announced that Asa Hutchinson, former Arkansas congressman and DEA chief, would lead the NRA's National School Shield Emergency Response Program, saying "The only way to stop a bad guy with a gun is with a good guy with a gun."

LaPierre blamed the Sandy Hook incident, and others like it, on "lack of mental health reform and the prevalence of violent video games and movies".

LaPierre has stated his support for the following:
 Increasing funds for a stricter and more efficient mental health system, and reform of civil commitment laws to facilitate the institutionalization of the mentally ill when necessary.
 Creating a computerized universal mental health registry of those adjudicated to be legally incompetent, to help limit gun sales to the mentally ill.
 Increasing enforcement of federal laws against and incarceration of violent gang members or felons with guns.
 Project Exile and similar programs that mandate severe sentences for all gun crimes, especially illegal possession. LaPierre stated, "By prosecuting them, they prevent the drug dealer, the gang member, and the felon from committing the next crime... Leave the good people alone and lock up the bad people and dramatically cut crime."
 Restriction on "bump-fire" type rifle stocks, in the aftermath of the Vegas shooting in 2017.
 Bans on fully automatic firearms.

Criticism
In 1995 in the aftermath of the Waco and Ruby Ridge incidents, LaPierre wrote a fundraising letter describing federal agents as "jack-booted government thugs" who wear "Nazi bucket helmets and black storm trooper uniforms to attack law-abiding citizens."  The term "jack-booted government thugs" had been coined by United States Representative John David Dingell Jr., Democrat of Michigan, in 1981, referring to ATF agents, and came to be frequently repeated by the NRA. Former president George H. W. Bush was so outraged by the letter that he resigned his NRA life membership. In response to growing criticism, LaPierre apologized, saying he did not intend to "paint all federal law-enforcement officials with the same broad brush".

In 2000, LaPierre said President Bill Clinton tolerated a certain amount of violence and killing to strengthen the case for gun control and to score points for his party. Clinton White House spokesman Joe Lockhart called it "really sick rhetoric, and it should be repudiated by anyone who hears it". In 2004, citing Democratic candidate John Kerry's history of authoring and supporting gun control legislation, LaPierre actively campaigned against the senator in the 2004 presidential elections.

In response to the Sandy Hook Elementary School shooting, he connected gun violence with "gun-free zones", violent films and video games, the media, weak databases on mental illness and lax security, and called for armed officers at American schools in an effort to protect children from gun violence. Following the event, several in the media criticized LaPierre's statements, including the Pittsburgh Post-Gazette editorial board and The Atlantics Jeffrey Goldberg. Others also criticized the NRA's remarks, including Republican Party strategist and pollster Frank Luntz.

In response to the February 14, 2018 Stoneman Douglas High School shooting in Parkland, Florida, LaPierre delivered a speech on February 22 at the Conservative Political Action Conference (CPAC) held in National Harbor, Maryland, in which he criticized the FBI, the media and gun control advocates. "As usual, the opportunists wasted not one second to exploit tragedy for political gain. The elites do not care one whit about America's school system and schoolchildren. If they truly cared, what they would do is they would protect them. For them it is not a safety issue, it is a political issue ... [Gun control advocates] don't care if their laws work or not. They just want get more laws to get more control over people. But the NRA, the NRA does care." David Graham of The Atlantic questioned his reference to "elites," since LaPierre earns millions from his work. LaPierre also argued that the constitutional right to keep and bear arms "is not bestowed by man, but granted by God to all Americans as our American birthright."

On April 27, 2021 a video emerged of LaPierre shooting an African bush elephant at point blank range on a 2013 hunting trip in Botswana. The video drew criticism from conservation groups.

References

External links 

 Wayne LaPierre's NRA Press Conference Announcing National School Shield Program, as delivered transcript, audio, video, December 21, 2012
 
 
 
 

1949 births
Living people
American gun rights activists
American political writers
American people of Breton descent
American people of French-Canadian descent
American male non-fiction writers
American television personalities
Writers from New York (state)
Writers from Roanoke, Virginia
People from Schenectady, New York
Siena College alumni
National Rifle Association
Catholics from Virginia
Catholics from New York (state)
Gun politics in the United States
Activists from New York (state)